Harald Sverre Olsen (15 June 1921 – 17 September 2020) was a Norwegian politician for the Labour Party.

Olsen served as a deputy representative to the Norwegian Parliament for Troms from 1969 to 1983. 

He died in September 2020 at the age of 99.

References

External links

1921 births
2020 deaths
Deputy members of the Storting
Labour Party (Norway) politicians
Troms politicians